The 2015–16 Texas–Rio Grande Valley Vaqueros women's basketball team represents the University of Texas Rio Grande Valley during the 2015–16 NCAA Division I women's basketball season. This was head coach Larry Tidwell's third season, but first under the UT-RGV label. The Vaqueros played their home games at the UTRGV Fieldhouse and were members of the Western Athletic Conference. This was the first season for UTRGV as an institution. Before the 2015–16 academic year, the University of Texas–Pan American and the University of Texas at Brownsville merged, forming the University of Texas Rio Grande Valley. They finished the season 19–14 and 9–5 in WAC play to finish in second place. They advanced to the championship game of the WAC women's tournament where they lost to New Mexico State. They were invited to the Women's National Invitation Tournament where they lost in the first round to TCU.

Previous season 
The Broncs finished the season 19–15, 9–5 in final WAC play to finish in third place. They lost in the championship of the WAC Tournament to New Mexico State.

Departures

2015–16 media
For the first time in club history women's basketball games will be televised. 9 of 11 home games will air on TWCS (Ch 323), with 6 of the 9 games airing live. The other two home games will air on the TWCS Alternate Channel (Ch 825). Other games will air on WAC Digital Network or road teams video feeds.

Roster

Schedule and results 

|-
!colspan=9 style="background:#; color:white;"| Non-conference regular season

|-
!colspan=9 style="background:#; color:white;"| WAC regular season

|-
!colspan=9 style="background:#; color:white;"| WAC Women's Tournament

|-
!colspan=9 style="background:#; color:white;"| WNIT

- Games will be televised on tape delay.

See also
2015–16 Texas–Rio Grande Valley Vaqueros men's basketball team

References 

UT Rio Grande Valley Vaqueros women's basketball seasons
Texas-Rio Grande Valley